The York Street station is a station on the IND Sixth Avenue Line of the New York City Subway. It is served by the F train at all times and the <F> train during rush hours in the peak direction. It is located at York Street and Jay Street in Dumbo and is the only Sixth Avenue Line station in Brooklyn.

History

Background
More than 50 years before the construction of the IND Sixth Avenue Line, the intersection of York and Jay Streets was between two stations on the original BMT Lexington Avenue Line. West of the intersection was York and Washington Streets station, which had a connection to the Brooklyn Bridge via the New York and Brooklyn Bridge Railway. One block east of the station was the Bridge Street station. The line and the two stations ran west to east, were built by Brooklyn Elevated Railroad on May 13, 1885 and closed by Brooklyn Rapid Transit on April 11, 1904.

Construction and opening
The IND Sixth Avenue Line was designed to replace the elevated IRT Sixth Avenue Line. The first portion of the line to be constructed was then known as the Houston–Essex Street Line, which ran under Houston, Essex, and Rutgers Streets. The contract for the line was awarded to Corson Construction in January 1929, and construction of this section officially started in May 1929.

The York Street station opened on January 1, 1936, as the southern terminus of the first four stations to open on the Sixth Avenue Line. Two local tracks split from a junction with the Eighth Avenue Line south of West Fourth Street–Washington Square, running east under Houston Street and south under Essex Street to a temporary terminal at East Broadway. The station was initially served by E trains to Church Avenue. Just after midnight on April 9, 1936, trains began running under the East River via the Rutgers Street Tunnel, which connected the Houston-Essex Street Line with the north end of the Culver Line at a junction with the Eighth Avenue Line north of Jay Street–Borough Hall. E trains were sent through the connection to Church Avenue. When further sections of the Sixth Avenue Line opened on December 15, 1940, the F train replaced the E train at the East Broadway station.

Station layout 

This underground, deep-level station has two tracks and one narrow island platform. Located at the southern end of the Rutgers Street Tunnel, it has round deep-bore walls with matte-finish white brick tiling and purple tile border. The platform contains six large circular piers supporting the Manhattan Bridge, which contain white-brick tiling. The standard I-beam columns are painted blue with alternating ones having black name plates in white lettering.

To the north of the station, the Sixth Avenue Line continues via the Rutgers Street Tunnel to Manhattan; to the south, it converges with the IND Eighth Avenue Line and ends north of Jay Street. The Sixth Avenue Line tracks continue south as the IND Culver Line.

Exit

Northern exit

The only exit, located at the station's north end, leads to the Rutgers Street tunnel ventilation tower at the intersection of York Street and Jay Street. It has a turnstile bank and long passageway and staircase to the platform.

Proposed southern exit
There were proposals for a mezzanine at the station's south end, with an unbuilt entrance leading to the intersection of High Street and Jay Street. The lack of an entrance created dangerous conditions. For example, when the northern exit was obscured by smoke during a fire in 2003, several commuters were hospitalized because they were mistakenly diverted to the south end of the platform. In 2016, Delson or Sherman Architects proposed a new accessible entrance at the south end of the York Street station.

The MTA started conducting a feasibility study for a new entrance in 2021, following complaints from local residents and politicians who said the single entrance posed a safety hazard. The study found that both options for a new southern entrance would be prohibitively expensive because of the complex infrastructure around the site. A full stair and elevator entrance would cost $420–450 million, while an entrance containing only elevators would cost $230–260 million. In both cases, a new mezzanine would need to be constructed. At the time, the MTA was expected to receive $7 million for station improvements from the developer of a nearby building.

Points of interest
Dumbo Tech Triangle
Farragut Houses
Brooklyn Navy Yard
Commandant's House at Brooklyn Navy Yard

References

External links 

 
 Station Reporter — F Train
 The Subway Nut — York Street Pictures
 York Street entrance from Google Maps Street View
 Platform from Google Maps Street View

IND Sixth Avenue Line stations
New York City Subway stations in Brooklyn
Railway stations in the United States opened in 1936
1936 establishments in New York City
Brooklyn Heights
Dumbo, Brooklyn